Oeneis macounii, the Canada Arctic or Macoun's Arctic, is a butterfly of subfamily Satyrinae that occurs in North America.

Description
The wingspan is 46 to 65 mm. The wings are bright orange brown with black borders on both wings. There are two black eyespots on each forewing and one on each hindwing.

Similar species
 Great Arctic (O. nevadensis)
 Chryxus Arctic (O. chryxus)

Range and habitat
Occurs from British Columbia to Quebec and south to Minnesota and Michigan. The habitat consists of openings in forests of western jack or lodgepole pine and rocky ridges in spruce forest.

Biology
There is one generation per year with adults on wing from early June to early July. East of south-eastern Manitoba, adults fly in even-numbered years. Westward, they are on wing in odd-numbered years.

Larval foods
 Poaceae

Adult foods
 Nectar

References

Butterflies of North America
Butterflies described in 1885
Oeneis